Ittefaq ( Coincidence) is a 2017 Indian Hindi-language neo-noir  mystery thriller film directed by Abhay Chopra, written by Chopra, Shreyas Jain and Nikhil Mehrotra, and produced by Gauri Khan and Shah Rukh Khan under Red Chillies Entertainment in association with Renu Ravi Chopra under B.R. Studios and Hiroo Yash Johar and Karan Johar under Dharma Productions. Remake of eponymous 1969 film, which was directed by Yash Chopra, the film stars Akshaye Khanna, Sidharth Malhotra and Sonakshi Sinha, and has a Rashomon effect storytelling style. 

The film was released on 3 November 2017. It did well on box office and received positive reviews from critics and audience, with praise for the direction, writing and performances.

Plot 
Vikram Sethi (Sidharth Malhotra) is an acclaimed British writer of Indian descent. On the launch of his third book in Mumbai, he finds his publisher wife Katherine dead in their hotel room. The police suspect him so he flees by car. As the cops give chase, his car overturns and he escapes with injuries, taking shelter in a nearby apartment. Maya (Sonakshi Sinha), a young housewife who lives there, spots a police car outside and rushes there for help.

The police find Vikram next to the body of her lawyer husband, Shekhar (Sameer Sharma), who has been murdered. They also find burnt photographs in the trash. Dev Verma (Akshaye Khanna), an officer investigating the double murder, interrogates Vikram and Maya.

According to Vikram's account, he fled from the police because he feared he would be framed for his wife's murder. He found Maya at her door and asked for help. He added that his wife did not attend the book launch, as she was unwell and took medicines for a heart ailment. Vikram entered Maya's flat and said that she attempted to seduce him. Maya introduced Chirag, who entered her house saying he was her husband. When Vikram saw a wallpaper photo on her PC and realized Chirag was not Maya's husband, Chirag struck him with a candle-holder and Vikram lost consciousness. Upon waking, he found Shekhar's body next to him. While in custody Vikram was shown removing his shoe as if his foot is sore or shoe is pinching him.

According to Maya's account, she found an injured Vikram at her door, asking for help. She let him in only to find out from the news that the police are looking for him for the murder of his wife. Vikram whipped out a knife and overpowered her, and began searching for documents at Shekhar's desk when she turned a visiting Chirag away, with whom she confessed of having an extramarital affair. Around midnight, her husband returned and struggled to free her from Vikram. Maya rushed outside to a police vehicle for help. By the time she returned, Vikram had killed her husband with a candle-holder.

Meanwhile, the police find that a gang rape victim named Sandhya (Sanyukta Timsina) committed suicide recently because Vikram had written his third book about that incident and, hoping to prevent his third book from being a failure, he had leaked her identity to generate buzz. Examination of Katherine's body reveals that she had died of a heart attack.

The forensic team informs Dev that Shekhar was attacked on the head by someone who was at least 6 feet tall. The police initially suspect Vikram as his height is 6’1". However, it is found that the burnt photographs were those of Maya and Chirag, who is also about 6 feet tall. The photographs had been taken by a detective hired by Shekhar. The police eventually conclude that Vikram's account is true and Maya and Chirag had killed Shekhar when he confronted them with the photos. Moreover, there was no mud on Shekhar's shoes at the time of his death. It had rained at 11 pm and there was mud on the streets. Vikram had stated that Shekhar had come home at 7:30, hence his account was believed to be true whereas Maya's account of her husband returning home at 12 am was labelled false as a result. Vikram is deemed innocent and released from custody. He cremates his wife's body, and Maya and Chirag are arrested and charged with Shekhar's murder.

At home, Dev is reading Vikram's second book when his wife Meera (Mandira Bedi) spoils that the protagonist dies of drug overdose. Dev rushes to the forensic doctor to check if Vikram's wife could have died from an overdose of the medicine she had been taking for her heart. They discover that the capsules had been tampered with and the dose was made three times higher than normal, which caused Katherine to have a fatal heart attack.

Dev calls Vikram while the latter is about to catch a flight back to London. On the phone, Vikram confesses to having killed Katherine and Shekhar. He killed Katherine because she was threatening to charge him for the suicide of Sandhya. Shekhar was the lawyer working with her to file a case against him. He fled to Shekhar's house to destroy the legal documents of the case. When Maya went out to seek help, he killed her husband and stumbled across the photographs with her lover. He partially burnt them and threw them in the trash, banking on the conviction that the police would find the ominously burnt, adulterous pictures, creating a convincing story to dupe the police, which would then insinuate the inquisitory suspicion that it was Maya, in conjunction with Chirag who had orchestrated the murder of her husband Shekhar in order to conceal her affair. He also switched Shekar's muddy shoes with his own. He tells Dev that he has already cremated his wife's body; thus there is no evidence left. Dev decides to catch Vikram and punish him even if he has to take an illegal action to do so. However, Vikram leaves for London on his flight as Dev watches helplessly.

Cast 
Akshaye Khanna as Dev Verma
Sidharth Malhotra as Vikram Sethi 
Sonakshi Sinha as Maya Sinha
Pavail Gulati as Chirag
Mandira Bedi as Meera Verma
Sameer Sharma as Shekhar Sinha

Production

Development 
The official announcement of the film was made in April 2016. The title of the film was said to be Ittefaq. The film was shot on a 50-day non-stop schedule. Co-produced by Red Chillies Entertainment, B. R. Studios & Dharma Productions, Ittefaq released on 3 November. Ittefaq is an adaptation of a 1969 film with the same name, produced by B. R. Chopra and directed by Yash Chopra. The film starred Rajesh Khanna, Iftekhar and Nanda in lead roles. While Sidharth Malhotra reprised Khanna's character, Nanda's role is essayed by Sonakshi Sinha. Akshaye Khanna plays Iftekhar's role. The film is directed by Abhay Chopra, grandson of BR Chopra, the producer of the original film. The makers of the film decided that the movie will not be promoted at any platform.
But before the release they came out with a campaign on Digital Media, requesting viewers not to disclose the culprit after watching movie.

Casting 
The makers of the film chose Akshaye Khanna, Sidharth Malhotra and Sonakshi Sinha to star in the film as lead roles. Rajkummar Rao was cast to play a doctor but he then opted out.

Filming 
The principal photography of the film started in February 2017. The film was shot entirely in Mumbai.

Marketing
Rather than using traditional and costly marketing techniques (reality show promotion, media interviews and city tours), the producers decided to focus on television, radio and print advertising.

Reception

Critical response 
On review aggregator Rotten Tomatoes, the film holds an approval rating of 89% based on nine reviews, with an average rating of 5.92/10. India Today reviewed "Sidharth-Sonakshi's murder mystery will keep you on your toes". The Indian Express stated the movie as "a smart, gripping whodunit". Deccan Chronicle called the movie "A crackling whodunnit".

Box office 
The film, which was released on 1100 screens throughout India, had a moderate opening of  40 million. Ittefaq was in competition with Golmaal Again, which released in Diwali, has been in strong position even after the third week. Hollywood's Thor: Ragnarok of the popular Marvel Cinematic Universe, which recorded strong opening collection, was released concurrently with the film thus affecting its business. Despite the tough competition, Ittefaq has been able to earn as much as ₹40 million by fighting against Golmaal Again and Thor: Ragnarok.

1st Day ₹40 million (India)
2nd Day ₹50.6 million (India)
3rd Day ₹60.5 million (India)

Music
The song ''Ittefaq Se'' was recreated by Tanishk Bagchi from the song Raat Baaki Baat Baaki from the film Namak Halal, originally composed by Bappi Lahiri and sung by Asha Bhosle, Shashi Kapoor and Lahiri.

References

External links 
 
 
 

2017 films
Indian mystery thriller films
Indian thriller drama films
Indian crime drama films
2017 thriller drama films
2010s Hindi-language films
Films distributed by Yash Raj Films
Films shot in Mumbai
Films set in Mumbai
Red Chillies Entertainment films
Remakes of Indian films
2010s mystery thriller films
2017 drama films